Bourgougnague is a commune in the Lot-et-Garonne department in southwestern France.

Population

History 

From the 4th century AD, barbarians swept into the Gallic Empire. In the 5th century, the Germanic peoples and Burgundians settled in the area. The town owes its name to these people: the pronunciation in Germanic gave "Burgundiaca" meaning "field of the Burgundians."

Sites and Monuments 

 The Church of Our Lady of Bourgougnague (Église Notre-Dame de Bourgougnague) from the 13th century. The choir was painted before World War II by the Italian painter Giovanni Masutti, from Stevana in the Treviso region.
 The Church of St. Lawrence (Église de Saint-Laurent).
 Jolibert Castle (Château de Jolibert) which houses the first of the Rural Family Homes (Maison familiale rurale - an association devoted to educate young people) in Europe.
 The manor of the great moor with its chapel dating from the 16th century. This area is a dependency of the Lauzun castle but was also a hunting reserve of King Henry IV.

See also
Communes of the Lot-et-Garonne department

References

Communes of Lot-et-Garonne